Morten Luther Gudmund Korch (1876–1954) was a Danish writer who wrote populist stories and romances about rural Denmark. During his lifetime, he was the most widely read author in Denmark. Korch wrote 123 novels, several of which were made into popular films. In 1937, Korch was awarded a Danish knighthood in the Order of Dannebrog. He is listed in the book of The 20th century's 100 most important people in Denmark.

Early life
Korch was born on 17 January 1876 in the small village of Over Holluf south east of Odense on the island of Fyn, Denmark. He was the son of a teacher and had seven siblings. At the age of 14, Korch left home and began an apprenticeship in business with his uncle in Nyborg. After finishing his apprenticeship, Korch worked for W. Løngreen in Odense, for whom he drove a horse-drawn wagon to farms selling various wares including porcelain and chemicals.

Writing career
Korch's first story, Jule Toner (Sounds of Christmas) was published in 1892 and his first book of stories, Fyensk Humør (Humor of Fyn) was published in 1898.  In 1916, at the age of 40, Korch decided to become a full-time author.

Korch was a writer of populist stories, which centered on the old-fashioned traditions of farms, small shops and rural merchants. His tales were built around the traditional adventure model of idyll-crisis-idyll. The characters tended to be stereotypes, and the problems clearly marked as a battle between good and evil which were always resolved happily. Beneath Korch's stories, there is a focus on the conservative patriarchal society and the belief in conservative Christian morals. Korch wrote 123 separate titles and sold more than 7 million books in Denmark alone. In 1937, Korch received a knighthood in the royal Danish society of Order of Dannebrog. By 1940, Korch was the mostly widely read author in Denmark, where he was known as "Denmark's Morten". From 1942 to 1947 he sat on the board of the Danish Writers Union.

Legacy
Several of Korch's novels were developed into successful movies. In 1950, film director Alice O'Fredericks made the first film of a Korch novel: his 1943 book De røde heste (The Red Horses). The simple story—young newlyweds who try to save the family horse farm from bankruptcy by winning a racing derby—became the biggest box office success in Danish cinema. By 1976, eighteen films had been produced of Morten Korch stories. Danish Historian Ib Bundebjerg wrote that these combined "a special Danish popular comedy tradition with a reassuring portrayal of a rural environment at a time of frenzied modernisation."

In 1999, Korch was listed in the book of The 20th century's 100 most important people in Denmark.

Personal life
In 1899 Korch married the niece of his first employer, Elna Marie Løngreen Fyrdendahl, with whom he had five children. After Elna died of tuberculosis in 1907, Korch married a second time, to Sophie Petrea Bruun in 1908 and they had two sons together. Sophie died in 1953, and one year later, on 8 October 1954, Korch died at the age of 78 in Hellerup near Copenhagen. He is buried in Fraugde, Fyn, the parish of his birth.

Bibliography

Regnebog for Almueskolernes yngste afdeling 1897
Fyensk humør (short stories) 1898
Fyenbosnak (oral stories) 1900
Sin egen sti (short stories) 1911
Guldglasuren (short story) 1912
Sejrgaarden (novel) 1913
En husmand 1914
Grundlovsbogen 1914
En æreskrans (short story) 1916
Familien på Uglegården(novel) 1917
Flintesønnerne (novel), 1917
Hans med Sejrskjorten (novel) 1917
En vagabond (short story) 1918
Kongemøllen (novel) 1918
Skytten på Urup (novel) 1918
Fru Sara på Enø (short story) 1919
Studeprangeren (short story) 1919
Der brænder en ild (novel), 1920
Forklarende tekst 1920
Fra provinsen (short stories) 1920
Godtfolk (short stories) 1920
Krybskytten 1920
Kong Frederiks Korporal (novel and 2 stories) 1921
Uhrene i Rørby (novel)1921
Junker & Co (novel) 1922
Bent Billes løfte 1923
Det gamle guld (novel), 1923
Den grønne vogn 1924
Fortællinger og skitser (short stories) 1924
Godtfolk : ny samling 1924
Niels Dros (novel), 1924
Om fyenske dialekter 1925
Rolf Snare 1925
Palle Jarmer (novel) 1925
Kærlighed (2 stories) 1926
To juleaftener 1926
Lykkens hjul (novel) 1926
Den danske jul 1927
Manden på Brusholm 1927
Perler paa snor (novel), 1927
I stjerneskær (novel), 1928
Fynboer 1929
Landsbyprinsessen (stage play) 1929
Lykkesmeden (novel), 1929
Affæren i Mølleby (stage play) 1930
Ved Stillebækken (novel), 1930
Guldskoen (stage play) 1931
Kærlille (novel), 1931
I morgen får vi sol 1932
Klokkekilden 1933
Borgerlune 1934
Liv og lune (short stories) 1934
Blomstrende verden 1934
Byens bedste mand (short story) 1935
Møllen i Lunde 1935
Det fejreste træ 1935
De rige år 1936
Krisen på Rønnebæk (stage play) 1936
Lykkens luner (stage play) 1936
Troldsmeden (stage play) 1936
Fruen på Hamre 1937
Bonden fra Dige (novel)  1938
Pigen fra Dale 1938
Bertil Lynge 1939
Hammerprinsessen 1939
Kampen om Abildgaarden (novel), 1939
Indenfor voldene 1940
Under byens tage (novel) 1941
Lykkens hjul 1942
Det gamle teglværk 1942
De røde heste 1943
Den lille julegæst 1943
Landsbyfolk 1943
Ved den blaa fjord 1943
Sønnen fra Vingaarden 1944
Roman om Nikolaj (novel) 1944
Fynboer (short stories) 1946
Klokken paa Solbjerg 1946
Manden paa Naur 1946
Det store løb 1947
Fortryllende dage (short stories)  1948
Min moders minde" (essays) 1948Morten Korch : 1898 - 22. September 1948 1948Mosekongen 1948Doktor Ole 1949Julekurven 1949Fløjtespilleren (novel) 1950Troldpigen 1951Kampen om Torndal 1952Frodige dage 1952

Notes

Further reading
Lorentzen, Jørgen, "Fra farskapets historie i Norge 1850-1912", 2012. p.2o & p.32-33.
Rytter, Maria, "Du må ikke græde far - Morten Korch som far omkring 1900", 2009. 143 pg.
Rytter, Maria, "Den ukendte Morten Korch - Dagbøger, breve og optegnelser 1876-1914", 2000. 282 pg.
Rytter, Maria, "Morten Korch på Møntergården - udstillingstekster", 1994.  62 pg.
Berthelsen, Carsten, Morten og det danske guld. Morten Korch for begyndere. 1998. 80 pg.
Lundbye, Vagn, Hundred år efter Morten Korchs første bog, (speech given at Odense Town hall) Bogens Verden, 1998, nr. 6, pg. 11-13.
Johansen, Klaus, Morten Korch. En bibliografi. 1995. 62 pg.
Mylius, Johan de, Traditionens guld - og Landmandsbankens, NORDICA, IV, 1987, pg. 65-94 (+ addendum pg. 95-99).
Korch, Morten A., Min far Morten Korch, 1979. 153 pg
Andersen, Frantz Smolle, Olav Harsløf, Freddie Pagh, Gitte Pedersen, Kirsten Dyssel Pedersen, Henrik V. Petersen & Ivan Z. Sørensen, Bogen om Morten Korch En smaaborgers virksomhed. 1977. 288 pg.
Knudsen, Finn Bruun, Freddie Pagh & Ivan Zlebaci Sørensen, Fascismen i 30erne, Litteratur & Samfund, nr. 4-5, 1975, pg. 10-75. (pg. 42-66 address Morten Korch's I morgen får vi sol.)
Korch, Morten A., Morten Korch'', Folkeminder, nr. 14-15, 1969–71, pg. 213-20.

1876 births
1954 deaths
Danish male short story writers
Danish male novelists
20th-century Danish novelists
20th-century Danish male writers